Sydney James Stirling  (born 16 December 1951) is a former Australian politician. He was the Labor member for Nhulunbuy in the Northern Territory Legislative Assembly from 1990 to 2008.

|}

Stirling was born in Kyneton, Victoria, and worked as a teacher before his election to parliament. He challenged for the Labor leadership twice, but was easily defeated. In 1999 he was elected Deputy Leader to Clare Martin, and served as Deputy Chief Minister following the ALP's election win in 2001. He resigned along with Martin in November 2007, and retired at the 2008 election.  He is currently the president of the Northern Territory division of the Labor Party.

Stirling was appointed a Member of the Order of Australia in the 2021 Queen's Birthday Honours, for "significant service to the Legislative Assembly of the Northern Territory, and to the community".

References

1951 births
Living people
Members of the Northern Territory Legislative Assembly
Members of the Order of Australia
Australian Labor Party members of the Northern Territory Legislative Assembly
Deputy Chief Ministers of the Northern Territory
Attorneys-General of the Northern Territory
Treasurers of the Northern Territory
People from Kyneton
21st-century Australian politicians